Jess Winfield (born March 8, 1961) is an American novelist, self-help author, television writer, and voice actor who is a founding member of The Reduced Shakespeare Company. His books include: What Would Shakespeare Do (2000) and My Name Is Will (2008). He wrote for and served as an executive producer of a number of animated television series, including Teacher's Pet and Lilo & Stitch: The Series. He is also the official voice actor for Jumba Jookiba in the latter series' franchise since 2009, voicing the character in the English versions of the anime Stitch! and the Chinese animated series Stitch & Ai.

Theatrical work
In 1981, Winfield joined writer-performer Adam Long and actor Daniel Singer to found the Reduced Shakespeare Company, a collective dedicated to the writing and performing of Shakespearean parodies. In 1987, the Company presented The Complete Works of William Shakespeare (Abridged), which became an international hit and, eventually, the longest running comedy production in London's West End, where it was nominated for a Laurence Olivier Award for Best New Comedy in 1997. He contributed to the editing and adapting of The Complete Works for publication and television performance.

Television
After departing from The Reduced Shakespeare Company, Winfield served as a writer for the Daytime Emmy Award-winning series Teacher's Pet (starring Nathan Lane and Jerry Stiller). He worked extensively for Disney's Lilo & Stitch franchise, writing the animated features Stitch! The Movie and Leroy & Stitch (also serving as a dialogue director), executive producing Lilo & Stitch: The Series, and voicing Jumba Jookiba in the English versions of Stitch! and Stitch & Ai, taking over the role from David Ogden Stiers (who later died in March 2018, the month after Stitch & Ais original English version first aired); Winfield has yet to reprise the role after Stitch & Ai and Stiers's death. He has also written scripts for several other television series such as Mickey Mouse Works, All-New Dennis the Menace, House of Mouse, The Penguins of Madagascar, The Legend of Tarzan, Buzz Lightyear of Star Command, 101 Dalmatians: The Series, The Savage Dragon, The Incredible Hulk and Hercules.

Author
Jess Winfield was born Jess Borgeson, and changed his name to Winfield in 1993 after marrying his wife, Sandra Thomson; his works prior to 1993 are known under this former name. Winfield is the author of What Would Shakespeare Do (Ulysses Press, 2000), a self-help book that employs Shakespearean drama as a basis for advice. In 2008, he published the novel My Name Is Will (Twelve/Hachette Book Group, 2008).  The work uses a historically plausible story of William Shakespeare's young adulthood in conjunction with a comic modern plot to explore themes of religious persecution, authorial intent, and human sexuality. It has been stated that the modern portion of the novel's plot has been based, in part, on Winfield's years studying Shakespeare in Santa Cruz and Berkeley.

Writing credits

Television
Adventures of Sonic the Hedgehog (1993)
All-New Dennis the Menace (1993)
Biker Mice from Mars (1994-1996)
Action Man (1995)
The Incredible Hulk (1996)
The Savage Dragon (1996)
Beast Wars: Transformers (1996)
101 Dalmatians: The Series (1997-1998)
Hercules (1998)
Mickey Mouse Works (1999)
Buzz Lightyear of Star Command (2000)
The Legend of Tarzan (2001)
House of Mouse (2001-2002)
Teacher’s Pet (2002)
Lilo & Stitch: The Series (2006)
The Penguins of Madagascar (2011)

Film
Tarzan & Jane (2002)
Stitch! The Movie (2003)
Leroy & Stitch (2006)

Stage theater
The Complete Works of William Shakespeare (Abridged) (1987)

Video games
Stitch: Experiment 626 (2002)

References

External links 
  (archived page)
 

1961 births
Living people
21st-century American novelists
American male novelists
American self-help writers
American television writers
American male screenwriters
American television producers
American male television writers
American voice directors
21st-century American male writers
21st-century American non-fiction writers
American male non-fiction writers
American male voice actors
21st-century American screenwriters